Jean-Jacques Andrien (born 1 June 1944) is a Belgian film director.  Le Monde deem his film Le Grand Paysage d'Alexis Droeven (1981), to be the first great Film of a Walloon cinema  This film addresses two problems; the first is that of Belgium's region, site of a bitter conflict between Flemish and Walloon inhabitants, and the second that of a dramatic changes that have affected the agricultural world. The film was entered into the 31st Berlin International Film Festival where it won an Honourable Mention.

Filmography
see 

 L'babou  1970
 La Pierre qui flotte (1971)
 Le Rouge, le rouge et le rouge (1972) (10 minutes)
 Le Fils d'Amr est mort (1971) André Cavens Award; Leopard of Honour Locarno International Film Festival
 Le Grand Paysage d'Alexis Droeven (1981) (88 minutes) André Cavens Award; Grand Prix du festival d'Aurillac
 Mémoires (1985) (55 minutes] Golden Plaque International Filmfestival Mannheim-Heidelberg
 Australia (1989) (118 minutes) Best Photography Venice Film Festival

Notes

External links
 Cinéma Wallonie Interview, Photos, in French
 Biography for Jean-Jacques Andrien

1944 births
Living people
People from Verviers
Belgian film directors
Walloon people
Walloon culture